Lenyn José Sosa (born January 25, 2000) is a Venezuelan professional baseball infielder for the Chicago White Sox of Major League Baseball (MLB).

Career
Sosa signed with the Chicago White Sox as an international free agent in July 2016. Sosa was called up to the majors for the first time on June 23, 2022. On August 9, during the second game of a double-header, Sosa hit his first Major League home run off of Kansas City Royals pitcher Jonathan Heasley.

Sosa was optioned to the Triple-A Charlotte Knights to begin the 2023 season.

References

External links

2000 births
Living people
Major League Baseball players from Venezuela
Major League Baseball infielders
Chicago White Sox players
Arizona League White Sox players
Great Falls Voyagers players
Kannapolis Intimidators players
Winston-Salem Dash players
Birmingham Barons players